Tadeusz Manteuffel or Tadeusz Manteuffel-Szoege (1902–1970) was a Polish historian, specializing in the medieval history of Europe.

Manteuffel was born in Rēzekne, Vitebsk Governorate, Russian Empire (now Latvia). His brothers were Leon Manteuffel-Szoege and Edward Manteuffel-Szoege. He lost his right hand in the Polish-Soviet War in 1920 when he took part in the defence of Warsaw. Manteuffel studied medieval history in Poland, France, and Italy and later taught at Warsaw University, becoming a known medievalist before 1939.

During the Second World War, Manteuffel was an activist in the education and information section (Biuro Informacji i Propagandy Armii Krajowej) of the Polish Secret State in German-occupied Poland, where he contributed to and edited underground newspapers and leaflets (Wiadomości Polskie)  and from 1940 to 1944 he organized underground history seminars in the then-outlawed Warsaw University.

After the war, Manteuffel was active in rebuilding Warsaw University, where he organized the History Institute and its library.  In 1950-53 he directed the Polish Historical Society, and he co-founded the Polish Academy of Sciences, creating and directing its Institute of History, later named for him.

Works 
A student and friend of Marceli Handelsman, Manteuffel dedicated his life to history as a student, teacher, scholar and activist. He advocated the creation and clarification of historian code of ethics, warned about the dangers of misinterpreting and falsifications of history. He specialized in the Medieval history of Europe, political history, history of social movements and cultural structures.

Manteuffel authored many articles and books, including Narodziny herezji (The Birth of Heresy) and  Historia Powszechna. Średniowiecze (Universal History: The Medieval Period), Polska w okresie prawa książęcego 963-1194 (The Formation of the Polish State:  The Period of Ducal Rule, 963-1194).

Among his students were Edward Potkowski, and Jerzy Kolendo.

See also 

 List of Poles

References 

 Biography at the Polish Ministry of Science and Education  
 Homepage of The Tadeusz Manteuffel Institute of History

Further reading 
 Paul W. Knoll, "Forward: Tadeusz Manteuffel, The Man, The Historian, and Historiography," in Tadeusz Manteuffel, The Formation of the Polish State, The Period of Ducal Rule 963-1194, translated by Andrew Gorski (from Polska w okresie prawa ksiazecego 963-1194 in Historyk wobec historii [Warsaw, 1976—a selection of Manteuffel's writings]) (Detroit: Wayne State University Press, 1982), pp. 7–20.

1902 births
1970 deaths
People from Rēzekne
People from Rezhitsky Uyezd
Polish people of German descent
20th-century Polish historians
Polish male non-fiction writers